Rockman EXE The Medal Operation is an arcade game in the MegaMan Battle Network sub-series of Mega Man games from Capcom. It uses various elements from the fifth Battle Network video game. It was never released outside Japan.

External links
Rockman EXE The Medal Operation at the official Japanese website of Capcom

2005 video games
Arcade video games
Arcade-only video games
Medal Operation
Video games developed in Japan